Sharp Samurai (foaled  March 9, 2014) is an American Thoroughbred racehorse and the winner of the 2018 City of Hope Mile Stakes.

Career

Sharp Samurai's first race was on November 5, 2016, at Santa Anita, where he came in 8th. He was able to pick up his first win in his next race on February 10, 2017, in a Maiden Claiming race at Santa Anita.

He grabbed his first stakes win six races into his career, when he won the Rainbow Stakes on June 10, 2017, at Santa Anita. He defeated 2nd place finisher, Conquest Farenheit, by 1 and 1/4th lengths to win $75,000.

This victory started a four win race streak. His next victory came on August 6, 2017, when he captured his first graded stakes win - the Grade-3 La Jolla Handicap. He came in at 1:1 odds as the favorite and defeated Fashion Business by a length.

On September 3, 2017, he picked up a Grade-2 win at the Del Mar Derby. He came into the race as the 2:1 favorite and was able to beat Big Score by a half-length and Bowies Hero by a full length.

On October 28, 2017, he won the Grade-2 Twilight Derby. He came in again as the race favorite at 2:1 odds and again defeated Big Score and Bowies Hero for the win.

He came in 2nd at both the Del Mar Mile Handicap and the Eddie Read Stakes in 2017. He did not get another stakes race victory until October 6, 2018, when he came in first at the Grade-2 City of Hope Mile Stakes. He came in as the 6:5 favorite and won by a nose over 2:1 Fly to Mars.

Sharp Samurai had more close calls, but no victories in his 2019 season. He came in 3rd at the 2019 Grade-3 American Stakes in June and came in 2nd at the Grade-2 Del Mar Handicap in August, which was his last race of the season.

He had similar luck to start his 2020 season with another 3rd place finish at the 2020 American Stakes and a 2nd place finish at the July 26th, 2020, Eddie Read Stakes, which was won by United.

Pedigree

References

2014 racehorse births